The Lamar Cardinals football program represents Lamar University in college football at the NCAA Division I Football Championship Subdivision (formerly Division I-AA) level. The Cardinals are members of the Southland Conference and play their home games in the 16,000 seat Provost Umphrey Stadium. The Cardinals left the Southland Conference in July 2021 to join the Western Athletic Conference, which relaunched its football league at the FCS level during the 2021 season.  After one season in the WAC, Lamar and the Southland Conference announced on July 11, 2022 Lamar's accelerated return to the Southland Conference effective immediately.

History

The early years
From its inception as South Park Junior College in 1923, football was a part of Lamar's history. It was discontinued in 1928 because of a lack of common opponents but was revived again in 1932 by the renamed Lamar College. Coach John Gray led his charges to records of 8–1 that season and 8–1–1 in 1934 before the program was discontinued again in 1942 and did not resume again until the end of World War II. Football was restored in 1946 and the first football scholarships were offered. In the 1946 season Lamar posted an 8–2 ledger. The 1948 club (8–4–0) won two bowl games, and the 1949 outfit won an all time school record 10 games and another bowl trophy as the school bade farewell to the junior college era.

After the school moved up to the NAIA level in the Lone Star Conference, the Cardinals didn’t have a winning season until a superb 8–0–2 season in 1957 ignited a string of 11 consecutive winning campaigns. The 1961 team advanced to the Tangerine Bowl (now the Capital One Bowl) against Middle Tennessee State on December 29, 1961, and won 21–14.

Just as the Cardinals were becoming a perennial contender in the Lone Star loop, school officials moved the athletic program forward into the National Collegiate Athletic Association (NCAA) college division ranks in 1963 via the Southland Conference. The football team enjoyed immediate success with three straight SLC grid titles (1964–66). In 1964 the Cardinals were invited to the Pecan Bowl after a 6–3–1 campaign. The Cardinals lost 19–17 to Northern Iowa. The Cardinals had a second-place finish in 1967. A year later, the school's athletic program embarked on another challenge by upgrading to the NCAA Division I level.

Lamar averaged 12,000 patrons through 1974, drawing a then record 16,226 against arch-rival McNeese State to Cardinal Stadium in 1972. The transition to Division I proved to be a spark for many LU sports but football experienced a downturn after 1974. Fans responded when new coach Larry Kennan delivered a 6–3–2 club in 1979; Games against Louisiana Tech (17,600) and West Texas State (17,250) rank second and third, respectively, behind the standing-room-only 18,500 Baylor drew for the 1980 opener. Lamar set an all-time attendance record by averaging 16,380 that season. The Cardinals’ signature win came on September 5, 1981, in an 18–17 win over the UPI No. 20 ranked Baylor Bears under Head Coach Larry Kennan.

Football competed as an independent from 1987 to 1989 after Lamar left the Southland Conference in 1987 to join the newly formed non-football American South Conference.

Disbandment and reintroduction
Dismal support finally led to larger-than-expected deficits and provided the bottom line fodder for five new appointees to the then-Lamar University System board of regents to discontinue football at their first official session on December 15, 1989 (5 to 4 vote). Their vision was to divert money that was being spent on football to the basketball program and build Lamar into a basketball powerhouse.

In 2010, as a member of the Texas State University System, the university brought the football team back. In preparation for the return of play the University did extensive work on the facilities including, Provost Umphrey Stadium, a new 54,000 sq ft Athletic complex, and seven high class suites built into the existing Montagne Center, new field turf, and a new 26' X 51' video board. The university hired former NFL player Ray Woodard as the head coach to lead the charge in bringing the Cardinals back to the gridiron. Former Basketball Coach Billy Tubbs was hired as the Athletic Director in 2006 and had a significant role in bringing back the Cardinals football team.

The football program, discontinued at the end of the 1989 season, was restarted with its first season back in 2010. The team competed as an independent that year. The first conference competition following the restart was in 2011.

Conference affiliations

Division history

Early Years Reference:

Conference championships
† Denotes co-champions

Bowl games
Lamar participated in two NCAA College Division level bowl games, going 1–1.

FCS playoffs
Lamar participated in the NCAA Division I Football Championship playoffs for the first time in 2018.

Attendance

Highest attendance

Source:

Below is a list of the Cardinals best-attended home games (all at Provost Umphrey Stadium).

As of the 2022 season.

Yearly attendance
Below is the Cardinals' home attendance since program reinstatement.

 Attendance restricted due to COVID19 restrictions.

As of the 2022 season.

Rivalries

McNeese State

The two teams have met 40 times on the football field, with McNeese State holding a 28–11–1 edge in the all-time series. The rivalry has been expanded from football to head-to-head competition in all sports under a joint agreement with the two universities and Verizon Wireless.

Louisiana

The first Sabine Shoe trophy was first awarded in 1937 to the winner of the SLI–Lamar football game. The name of the bronze rivalry trophy was derived from the Sabine River that forms the Texas–Louisiana border. USL defeated Lamar in the 1978 edition of the rivalry game, but the Ragin' Cajuns were not awarded the trophy as it had vanished. The Sabine Shoe trophy now sits in at trophy case in the Ragin' Cajun Athletic Complex.

Future scheduled non-conference games
source:

See also
 List of NCAA Division I FCS football programs

References

External links
 

 
American football teams established in 1923
1923 establishments in Texas